The National Convention of Baptist Churches in Honduras is a Baptist Christian denomination in Honduras. It is affiliated with the Baptist World Alliance. The headquarters is in Tegucigalpa.

History
The National Convention of Baptist Churches in Honduras has its origins in an American mission of the International Mission Board in 1946. en  It is officially founded in 1958.  According to a denomination census released in 2020, it claimed 532 churches and 23,660 members.

See also
 Bible
 Born again
 Baptist beliefs
 Worship service (evangelicalism)
 Jesus Christ
 Believers' Church

References

External links
 Official Website

Baptist denominations in Central America
Baptist Christianity in Honduras